Jerry Ray Muckensturm (born October 13, 1953) is a former professional American football player who played linebacker for seven seasons for the Chicago Bears. He played his college ball for Arkansas State University.

Muckensturm was injured in the Chicago Bears Week 3 contest in 1983 against the New Orleans Saints on September 17, 1983, just one month shy of his 30th birthday. Muckensturm was injured on a kickoff and had to be carried off the field by his teammates after suffering a leg injury that ended his career.

References

1953 births
Living people
American football linebackers
Arkansas State Red Wolves football players
Chicago Bears players
Players of American football from Illinois
Sportspeople from Belleville, Illinois